Ghosks is the Bunk is a 1939 animated short starring Popeye, Olive Oyl and Bluto. Olive reads a ghost story to Popeye and Bluto. Bluto leaves and rigs a haunted house and lures them to it. But they quickly discover him and, even better, a can of invisible paint, and they get the better of him.

Voice Cast
 Jack Mercer ... Popeye 
 Margie Hines ... Olive Oyl
 Pinto Colvig ... Bluto
 Additional Voices by William Pennell

Title
Ghosks is the Bunk is the original title, but was mistakenly changed to "Ghosk is the Bunk" when re-colored years later. This mistake came from tracing over the original title card.

Releases
The black-and-white version of this short is available on DVD on Popeye the Sailor: 1938-1940, Volume 2.

The re-colored version of the short was shown on TBS from 1987 to 1992 as a segment of the Tom & Jerry Halloween Special.

References

External links

Popeye the Sailor theatrical cartoons
1930s American animated films
1939 films
1939 animated films
Paramount Pictures short films
American black-and-white films
Fleischer Studios short films
Short films directed by Dave Fleischer
American haunted house films
1939 short films